St. Aloysius Evening College (Mangalore) (SAEC) was opened by the Society of Jesus in 1966 in affiliation with the University of Mysore.

History
In 1966, Mangalore, Karnataka, was a growing city, with increasing need for workers. St. Aloysius College was given permission by the University of Mysore to start an evening college providing courses in the faculties of Arts and Commerce, at the pre-university level. This allowed those who were short of funds to finish their education while working.

In 2011 the College had been reaccredited by NAAC with a B grade and in 2013 it initiated the Masters in Commerce (M.Com.).

It currently offers also the Bachelor of Arts (B.A.), Bachelor of Business Management (B.B.M.), and Bachelor of Commerce (B.Com.), as well as a Diploma in Investment Management (DIM) and a Certificate Course in Photography (CCP).

See also
 List of Jesuit sites

References  

Jesuit universities and colleges in India
Pre University colleges in Karnataka
Universities and colleges in Mangalore
Educational institutions established in 1966
1966 establishments in Mysore State